Souls Alike is the fifteenth album by Bonnie Raitt, released in 2005.

Track listing
"I Will Not Be Broken" (Gordon Kennedy, Wayne Kirkpatrick, Tommy Sims) – 3:41
"God Was in the Water" (Randall Bramblett, Davis Causey) – 5:17
"Love on One Condition" (Jon Cleary) – 3:43
"So Close" (Tony Arata, George Marinelli, Pete Wasner) – 3:22
"Trinkets" (Emory Joseph) – 5:02
"Crooked Crown" (David Batteau, Maia Sharp) – 3:49
"Unnecessarily Mercenary" (Jon Cleary) – 3:51
"I Don't Want Anything to Change" (Stephanie Chapman, Liz Rose, Maia Sharp) – 4:29
"Deep Water" (John Capek, Marc Jordan) – 3:58
"Two Lights in the Nighttime" (Lee Clayton, Pat McLaughlin) – 4:22
"The Bed I Made" (David Batteau, Maia Sharp) – 4:59

Personnel 
 Bonnie Raitt – lead vocals, slide guitar, acoustic guitar (8)
 Jon Cleary – acoustic piano (1-8, 10, 11), Hammond B3 organ, Wurlitzer organ, rhythm guitar (3), backing vocals (3, 4, 7, 9)
 Mitchell Froom – Minimoog (1), additional acoustic piano (2), Rhodes piano (2), dolceola (4), additional Wurlitzer organ (6), additional baritone saxophone (6), additional Hammond B3 organ (8), additional orchestration (9)
 John Capek – acoustic piano (9), strings (9), bass (9), drum loops (9), percussion (9)
 George Marinelli – electric guitar, acoustic guitar, backing vocals (4, 10)
 David Batteau – synth guitar (6)
 James "Hutch" Hutchinson – bass (1-8, 10, 11)
 Ricky Fataar – drums, percussion
 Maia Sharp – backing vocals (1, 2, 6), baritone saxophone (6), tenor saxophone (11)
 Arnold McCuller – backing vocals (1, 5, 7, 9)
 Sweet Pea Atkinson – backing vocals (5, 7)

Production 
 Producer – Bonnie Raitt
 Co-Producer, Recording and Mixing – Tchad Blake
 Additional Recording and Mixing – Kevin Dean 
 Assistant Engineers – David Boucher, Ryan Doordan, Michael Rodriguez and Scott Wiley.
 Mastered by Bob Ludwig at Gateway Mastering (Portland, ME).
 Project Coordinator – Kathy Kane 
 Art Direction, Design and Background Photography – Norman Moore
 Photography – Sam Jones 
 Stylist – Kate Lindsay 
 Make-Up – Joanna Schlip 
 Management – Annie Heller-Gutwillig and Chloe Monahan

Charts
Album - Billboard (United States)

Singles - Billboard (United States)

References

External links
 

Bonnie Raitt albums
2005 albums
Albums produced by Tchad Blake
Capitol Records albums